Hana Micron (KOSDAQ 067310) is a semiconductor company specializing in assembly and product packaging as well as test and module manufacturing services. Hana Micron was founded in 2001 and its headquarters is located in Asan City, South Korea. As of 2011, Hana Micron has over 1,300 employees and reported over $260 million in sales.

Hana Micron has other offices around the world including offices in the United States, Brazil, and China. Hana Micron's manufacturing factories are located in South Korea and Brazil.

In 2007, Hana Silicon was created as a subsidiary of Hana Micron.  Hana Silicon provides consumable parts for the semiconductor etching process which is the silicon based cathode ring essential for manufacturing semiconductor products.

In 2008, Hana Micron America along with Hana Innosys were formed as a subsidiary of Hana Micron to concentrate on the SI (System Integration) business.  Hana Innosys has developed a system integration solution for animal traceability by using RFID technology.  In addition to the animal traceability solution, Hana Innosys has implemented a system integration solution for GPS fleet tracking systems.

References

External links 
 Hana Micron Company Website
 Hana Micron Stock Information
 Hana Micron About Us
 Hana Micron Assembly and Packaging
 Hana Micron Test and Module Services

Electronics companies established in 2001
South Korean companies established in 2001
Semiconductor companies of South Korea
South Korean brands
Companies listed on KOSDAQ
Companies based in South Chungcheong Province
Asan